This is a list of ports in Turkey grouped by sea and sorted after port name, wherein piers and special purpose terminals (oil, natural gas, LNG terminals) are separated. Marinas in Turkey  are not listed here.

Ownership and operation
Ports and berthing facilities in Turkey are owned and operated by three different groups, state owned companies, municipalities and private companies.

Major ports are owned and operated by the Turkish State Railways (TCDD) or Turkish Maritime Organization (TDİ), which are so-called State Economic Enterprises ( or KİT). However, some of these ports are already privatized and some others, which all belong to the TCDD, are within the ongoing privatization process.

Municipality owned ports are comparatively smaller. Limited to a small volume of coastal traffic, they serve the local needs of provincial towns.

Privately owned ports are mostly constructed and used in special purpose to the particular needs of the industrial plants. However, third parties are also allowed to use these ports.

Not a big portion of these ports have railway connections. Mainly the ones once or still owned by TCDD are connected to national railway network. Ports with railway connection are Limak Port Iskenderun, Mersin Port (Mediterranean Sea), Izmir Port, Nemport (Aegean Sea),  Samsunport, TTK Zonguldak Port (Black Sea), Derince Port, Evyap Port, Haydarpasa Port, Port of Bandirma,  Tekirdag Port, Yilport Yarimca (Marmara Sea). Also Isdemir, Tupras, Gubretas and Petrol Ofisi have their own ports which are connected to railway network.

Black Sea
Bartın
Erdemir (aka Karadeniz Ereğli)
Filyos (Zonguldak)
Giresun
Hopa
Ordu
Rize
Samsun
Tirebolu
Trabzon
Zonguldak TK

Piers
Bulancak Pier

Terminals
Durusu Terminal, Samsun Province

Turkish Straits and Sea of Marmara
Alemdar, Dilovası
Ambarlı, Istanbul Province
Akcansa Ambarli Port 	
Alemdar Port 
Ambarli Armaport
Ambarli Mardas Port
Ambarli Soyak Port
Bandırma
Derince
Diler, Hereke
Gemport 
Haydarpaşa, Istanbul
İstanbul
Kumport
Port of MartaşMartaş, Marmara Ereğlisi
Sedef, Dilovası
Tekirdağ (Akport)
Zeytinburnu (aka Zeyport)

Piers
Aksa (Akkim) Chemical Plant Pier, Yalova
Aktaş Chemical Plant Pier, İzmit
Altıntel Pier
Bagfaş Piers, Bandırma
Bortrans (Borusan) Pier, Gemlik
BP Gemlik Pier, Gemlik
Camar Installation Pier, İzmit
Çanakkale Pier
Çanakkale Cement (Akçansa) Pier, Çanakkale
Çanakkale TDİ Piers, Çanakkale
Çolakoğlu Metallurgy Pier
Elyaf Plant Pier, Yalova
Etibank Edincik Pier, Bandırma
Gemlik Pier, Gemlik
Gübretaş Fertilizer Pier, Yarımca
İgsaş Fertilizer Complex Pier, İzmit
Kızılkaya Pier, Dilovası
Lafarge Aslan Cement Piers, Darıca
Limaş Pursan Pier, İzmit
MKS Dolphin Pier, Gemlik
Mudanya Pier, Mudanya
Nuh Cement Pier, Hereke
POAŞ Pier, Çubuklu, Istanbul
POAŞ-Shell Pier, Derince
Poliport (Polisan) Pier, Dilovası
Rota/Korfez Piers
Tugsas (Nitro Factory) Pier, Gemlik
Yarımca Piers, Yarımca

Terminals
Aktaş Terminal, Derince
Aygaz LPG Terminal, Yarımca
Botaş Terminal, Marmara Ereğlisi
Çekisan (Mobil-Shell-BP) Terminals, Haramidere, Istanbul Province
Habas Terminal
Marmara Botas LNG Terminal
Petkim Terminal, Yarımca
Solventaş Terminal, Dilovası
Total Gebze Terminal, Gebze
Total Haramidere Terminal, Haramidere, Istanbul
Tüpraş Tütünçiftlik Refinery Terminal
Zülfikarlar Molasses Terminal, Yarımca

Aegean Sea
Dikili
Güllük
İzmir

Piers
Habaş Pier, Nemrut Bay
Ege Fertilizer Pier, Nemrut Bay
Limaş Pier, Nemrut Bay
Nemtaş Pier, Nemrut Bay
Seka Göcek Pier, Fethiye
Çukurova Pier, Nemrut Bay

Terminals
APM Terminals Izmir Aliağa Terminal
Total Aliağa Izmir Terminal
Tüpraş Aliağa Izmir Refinery Terminal

Mediterranean Sea
İskenderun 
Antalya
Mersin
İsdemir
Taşucu Seka
Assan (İskenderun)
Yeşilovacık

Piers
Ekinciler Pier, Iskenderun
Sariseki Fertilizer Pier, Iskenderun
Seka Mersin Pier
Taşucu Pier
Yazicilar Pier

Terminals
Botaş Oil Terminal, Ceyhan
Delta Terminal, Ceyhan
Toros Fertilizer Terminal, Ceyhan

See also
Marinas in Turkey
Ports of the Ottoman Empire

References

↑

External links
World Ports Source-Ports
Port Focus-Turkey

Turkey
 
Lists of buildings and structures in Turkey
Turkey transport-related lists